LaSalle Investment Management ("LaSalle") is a real estate investment management firm. It is an independent subsidiary of Jones Lang LaSalle (JLL), a real estate financial and professional services company.

LaSalle manages capital for institutions and private investors, investing in private and public real estate equity and debt through a range of investment vehicles.  LaSalle products include separate accounts, open and closed end funds, public securities, and entity level investments.  LaSalle’s client base includes public and private pension funds, insurance companies, governments, endowments and private individuals.

As of Q4 2015, LaSalle manages $59.0 billion of private and public property equity investments, and has nearly 700 employees in 17 countries worldwide. It was ranked the 5th largest private equity real estate firm globally in PEI's 2013 PERE ranking.

History 
Jones Lang LaSalle was formed by the merger of Jones Lang Wootton, a British firm with origins dating back to 1783, and LaSalle Partners, an American company formed from a predecessor launched in 1968, in 1999.  The respective fund management divisions merged to form LaSalle Investment Management.
LaSalle is headquartered at 333 Wacker Drive in Chicago, Illinois, where Jones Lang LaSalle also serves as building manager. Co-headquarters operate in London (covering Europe and the Middle East) and Singapore (covering Asia Pacific).

LaSalle has 24 bases in 17 countries around the world and manages funds for institutional investors such as public pension funds, corporate pension funds and insurance companies around the world, and the total assets under management are about 65 billion as of the end of June 2020.

Awards 
LaSalle was named "Best Property Manager of the Year "at the European Pensions Awards 2011.
 
In 2011, for the fourth consecutive year, Jones Lang LaSalle was named to the "World's Most Ethical Companies" list by Ethisphere Institute.

LaSalle won a sales award at the Investment Property Databank / Investment Property Forum Property Investment Awards 2011 in London.

Fortune magazine's list of "World's Most Admired Companies" recognized Jones Lang LaSalle in 2008, 2009, and 2011.

Sustainability in real estate 
LaSalle Investment Management has stated that they recognize buildings have a major impact on the environment. LaSalle has made a commitment to playing a role in addressing global environmental challenges through the investments it makes on behalf of clients, as well as the firm’s day-to-day operations.

In July 2009, LaSalle became a signatory as an Investment Manager to the United Nations-backed Principles for Responsible Investment (PRI).

LaSalle is a charter member and the largest pilot participant in a project to create a standardized metric for carbon measurement by commercial real estate. The Greenprint Foundation is a consortium of leading firms in commercial real estate and is at the forefront of creating metrics to determine the environmental impact of commercial real estate.

References

Real estate companies established in 1999
Financial services companies established in 1999
Investment management companies of the United States
Real estate services companies of the United States
JLL (company)
American companies established in 1999
Companies based in Chicago